The Windom Wetland Management District acquires and manages Waterfowl Production Areas, enforces wetland easements, and provides conservation assistance to landowners in 12 southwestern Minnesota counties (Brown, Cottonwood, Faribault, Freeborn, Jackson, Martin, Murray, Nobles, Pipestone, Redwood, Rock and Watonwan). The landscape is dominated by intense, row-crop agriculture, which has led to the drainage of most wetlands and widespread water quality problems. Deteriorating drainage tile systems and the abundance of historic wetland basins provide unlimited opportunities for wetland restorations.

Heron Lake is the focus of a multi-partner effort to restore the lake and its  watershed. The District is an active partner in this effort.

District staff work closely with private landowners to restore and protect degraded and critical habitat. Between 1990 and 2006, the District restored 690 wetlands, covering  on both public and private owned lands in the twelve counties it manages. During this same period,  of prairie remnants and native grasslands on 73 sites were restored or protected.

Construction of a 3/4 mile walking trail was completed in 2006 and is located adjacent to the headquarters and interpretive center at Wolf Lake WPA. The facility provides many opportunities for environmental education and interpretation opportunities with local schools and the visiting public.

The Windom Wetland Management District also manages the first fee title tract of the Northern Tallgrass Prairie National Wildlife Refuge. Touch the Sky Prairie is a nearly  unit of the refuge dedicated to helping preserve native tallgrass prairie. Less than one-tenth of one percent of the original Tallgrass Prairie remains.

References

District website

National Wildlife Refuges in Minnesota
Protected areas of Brown County, Minnesota
Protected areas of Cottonwood County, Minnesota
Protected areas of Faribault County, Minnesota
Protected areas of Freeborn County, Minnesota
Protected areas of Jackson County, Minnesota
Protected areas of Martin County, Minnesota
Protected areas of Murray County, Minnesota
Protected areas of Nobles County, Minnesota
Protected areas of Pipestone County, Minnesota
Protected areas of Redwood County, Minnesota
Protected areas of Rock County, Minnesota
Protected areas of Watonwan County, Minnesota
Wetlands of Minnesota
Landforms of Brown County, Minnesota
Landforms of Cottonwood County, Minnesota
Landforms of Faribault County, Minnesota
Landforms of Freeborn County, Minnesota
Landforms of Jackson County, Minnesota
Landforms of Martin County, Minnesota
Landforms of Murray County, Minnesota
Landforms of Nobles County, Minnesota
Landforms of Pipestone County, Minnesota
Landforms of Redwood County, Minnesota
Landforms of Rock County, Minnesota
Landforms of Watonwan County, Minnesota